Athens was one of the original bitmap typefaces for the Apple Macintosh computer. It was designed by Susan Kare. An official TrueType version was never made, and Athens was rendered obsolete with the arrival of System 7.

Alexandria by Hank Gillette and Athene by Rebecca Bettencourt are free TrueType fonts of similar design sometimes used as a surrogate on non-Apple systems.

References

Apple Inc. typefaces
Slab serif typefaces
Typefaces and fonts introduced in 1984
Typefaces designed by Susan Kare